The Orange Line (labeled as the Purple Line on maps prior to 2006) is a  light rail line operated by the Dallas Area Rapid Transit system in Dallas, Irving, Richardson and Plano, Texas. It runs from DFW Airport via downtown Dallas to Plano.

Route 

The line's current northwestern terminus is DFW Airport Station, located inside Dallas/Fort Worth International Airport.  The line proceeds southeast through Irving, providing service to the Irving Convention Center, Las Colinas, and the University of Dallas, before merging with the Green Line north of Bachman Station and proceeding southwest to Downtown Dallas.  The Orange Line shares the rest of its route with existing light rail lines, with stops along the Green Line from Bachman to Victory Station, through downtown Dallas on a corridor shared with the Green Line, Blue Line, and Red Line, and then northward along the Red Line corridor through Richardson to Plano.

Planned future Orange Line stations include a DFW North Station loop and an eastern extension down Scyene Road to Masters Drive (previously planned as a Green Line expansion).

History

Planning and construction 
The Orange Line was planned as an extension to the DART Light Rail system at least as early as 2006, when DART's 2030 System Plan described a "Northwest Corridor" route with expected revenue service to both Love Field and DFW Airport by 2013.

On March 12, 2007, the City of Dallas officials and DART made an agreement to make Love Field Station a surface-level facility, concluding a long debate over whether or not to make it an underground station closer to the airport.

On December 5, 2007, the Dallas Morning News ran a story reporting that DART President Gary Thomas said a previous cost estimate of $988 million was too low. The new cost estimate for the 14-mile project was $1.8 – $1.9 billion, he said. The $900 million overrun in costs caused considerable outrage among political leaders in Irving, Texas, the city the line runs through on its way to Dallas/Fort Worth International Airport. The Irving leaders conducted an inquiry into the cost overruns. Texas State Representative Linda Harper Brown sent an official letter to Mr. Thomas also inquiring about the project's cost overruns.

In February 2010 DART officials warned that the first two phases of the Orange Line might be delayed due to TXDOT problems along State Highway 114, which the Orange Line route follows. Utility relocation and road construction was expected to delay access to portions of the construction area where the rail line and highway intersect. DART estimated that the delay could push the opening of the Las Colinas extension from December 2011 to August 2012; however, DART also advised that it was determined to keep the original schedule and minimize any delays.

In June 2010, DART placed new Orange Line construction on indefinite hold due to declining revenue.  However, on September 15, 2010, the agency said that due to cost savings and federal funds, the plans for the line have been revived.

On December 13, 2011, DART awarded a contract to design and build the Orange Line extension from Belt Line Road to DFW Airport, valued at about $150 million, with construction to start in early 2012 and an opening date of August 18, 2014, ahead of schedule.

Opening and operation 
The Orange Line started operation on December 6, 2010, with weekday peak service from the Parker Road station to Bachman station on stations shared with DART's Red and Green lines. The first Orange Line-exclusive stations opened with the extension to Irving Convention Center on July 30, 2012, and two more were added on December 3, 2012. The current northwestern terminus, located at Dallas/Fort Worth International Airport, opened on August 18, 2014. Hidden Ridge Station, which was planned with the rest of the Orange Line but deferred until further development justified its construction, opened to revenue service on April 12, 2021.

Future plans
The Downtown Dallas segment of the route is planned to be rerouted off of the transit mall and run via a new subway tunnel between Victory and Deep Ellum. The D2 Subway is planned to be implemented in 2028 and will feature four new stations served by the Orange Line along the route.

Stations

Daily service 

Listed from Northeast to Northwest.  Peak-hour only service is highlighted

Special event service 
Listed from East to West
 Lawnview (Also served by the )
 Hatcher (Also served by the )
 MLK, Jr. (Also served by the )
 Fair Park (Also served by the )
 Baylor University Medical Center (Also served by the )
 Deep Ellum (Also served by the )

Future/deferred 
 Loop 12 station (deferred)
 South Las Colinas station (deferred)
 DFW North station (future branch)

References

External links 

 Full DART System Map
 DART Expansion Plans
 DART Orange Line Expansion Information

Dallas Area Rapid Transit light rail lines
Passenger rail transportation in Texas
Transportation in the Dallas–Fort Worth metroplex
Airport rail links in the United States